The Oregon Republican Party is the state affiliate of the United States Republican Party in Oregon, headquartered in Salem. The party was established in the Oregon Territory in February 1857 as the "Free State Republican Party of Oregon" and held its first state convention on April 1, 1859, after Oregon achieved statehood.

The Republican Party was the dominant political organization in the state of Oregon from the time of the American Civil War through the 1960s, before moving to a position of approximate parity with the rival Democratic Party of Oregon for the next four decades. Since 2000, the Oregon Republican Party has become a minority party in state government, which has generally been controlled by Democrats.

In recent years, the Oregon Republican Party has been the subject of significant controversy regarding the increasing influence of far-right organizations and militias within the party, especially during the presidency of Donald Trump. The party received national attention and widespread criticism for its efforts to overturn the 2020 United States presidential election, and its resolution claiming the 2021 United States Capitol attack was a false flag operation.

History

Antislavery origins

The politics of the Oregon Territory were largely dominated by the generally states' rights Democratic Party with a vocal pro-slavery component. Only weak opposition came from the Whigs and their nativist Know Nothing cousins. A serious opposition first began to emerge in the aftermath of the bitter and costly Rogue River Wars of 1855 to 1856, centered around the growing anti-slavery sentiment nationally and increasing threat that the Democratic Party would hasten the expansion of slavery in Oregon. Opposition to the Democrats gradually coalesced around the fledgling Republican Party that was intent upon slavery's limitation.

A first convention of Republicans in Oregon was held in May 1856 at the Lindley schoolhouse in Jackson County, with the gathering called for the nomination of candidates to appear on the June 1856 territorial ballot. The convention also adopted a resolution declaring that while Congress had no power over the existence of slavery in states in which it already existed, outside of such state jurisdictions federal power should be exerted to prevent its introduction.

Throughout 1856, antislavery sentiment continued to grow in Oregon, with Republican clubs springing up around the state. Republican county conventions were held in Clackamas, Washington, Marion, Linn, and possibly one or two other locales around the state. Representatives of these county gatherings were then assembled at a territorial organizing convention held in Albany on February 11, 1857, which adopted the official name "Free State Republican Party of Oregon" for the organization. A platform for the new political party was announced, emphasizing the indissoluble nature of the United States, opposition of the expansion of slavery to free territory, prohibition of polygamy, construction of a Pacific railroad to link Oregon with California, government effort to improve the navigability of rivers and harbors, and admission of Oregon to the United States only as a free state.

The year 1857 was marked by preparations for future Oregon statehood, including the holding of a constitutional convention, and the ruling Democratic Party found itself divided over the question of slavery, attempting to sidestep the issue by passing in state convention a resolution binding Democratic delegates to such a gathering to the position that the matter of slavery in Oregon be settled later by a vote of the people.

The Republicans did not nominate a candidate for Representative to Congress in the June 1857 election, instead pooling their support for G.W. Lawson, a Free Soil Democrat running as an independent. While pro-slavery Democrat Joseph Lane was ultimately sent as the Territorial delegate to Congress, voting further down the ticket showed a Republican advance, with Republicans joining with so-called "soft" (free state) Democrats to elect about a third of the delegates to the constitutional convention and 10 of the 30 members to the Oregon Territorial Legislature.

The constitutional convention held in the summer of 1857 ultimately steamrolled Republican sentiment and again sidestepped the slavery question by deciding to leave the slavery question to a vote of the people, while declaring that "no negro, Chinaman, or mulatto should have the right to vote." The bill of rights adopted by the Democratic-dominated constitutional convention gave the future state legislature the right to exclude African-Americans from immigrating to the state altogether, thereby setting the stage for restrictive racial laws in spite of Oregon's free state status.

Three propositions were ultimately put to territorial voters, with the Democratic-authored Oregon Constitution gaining approval by a vote of about 7,200 to 3,100, a measure allowing slavery falling to defeat by a majority of nearly 5,100 votes, and a proposal allowing "Free Negroes" to settle in Oregon overwhelmingly defeated by a vote of 8,640 to 1,081. Oregon would not be a slave state but rather one closed to black immigration — a law remaining on the books (albeit not in actual effect) into the 20th century.

19th century
On April 1, 1859, just two weeks after Oregon was admitted to the Union, the Republican Party held a convention in Salem at which it nominated David Logan as the party's choice for the state's first fully fledged Congressional representative. Logan would narrowly fall to defeat both in 1859 and again when nominated again for a full term in the election of 1860, but national political events would soon change the tide for the new political party. The Democratic Party found itself divided with the coming of the American Civil War between pro- and anti-Union elements. With the nation embroiled in war, pro-Union Democrats and Republicans put aside their differences at a fusion convention in April 1862, establishing themselves as the Union Party. This joint political organization would continue in Oregon through four elections under the Union Party banner, terminating only in 1868.

As the united political organization for a preserved United States of America in contradistinction to defeatists and Confederate sympathizers, the Union Party and, after 1868, the rechristened Republican Party experienced dramatic political gains in Oregon, buoyed by the defection and disenfranchisement of the Democratic South. The party, as one historian noted, began to "grow like the plant that sprang up from the mustard seed." An alliance of Republicans and pro-Union Democrats in the Oregon State Legislature came together in 1860 to elect Edward Dickinson Baker as the first Republican U.S. Senator from Oregon. An era of Republican dominance in Oregon was begun.

When the Civil War began in 1861, Baker raised his own militia, in which he served as commanding officer. On October 21, 1861, with Congress out of session, Colonel Baker and his men met Confederate forces on a hill called Ball's Bluff just outside Washington, D.C. Shortly after the battle started Baker was killed along with nearly 1,000 others.

Despite the untimely death of Oregon's first Senator, E.D. Baker would hardly be the last. Over the next 30 years a steady stream of Republicans were sent to the U.S. Senate by the Oregon legislature, including Benjamin F. Harding (1862), George H. Williams (1864), Henry W. Corbett (1866), John H. Mitchell (1872, reappointed 1885, re-elected 1887 and 1891), Joseph N. Dolph (1882, re-elected 1889), and George W. McBride (1895).

By the 1890s, the ideology of the two major parties had begun to switch, with the Republican Party emerging as the party of sound money, industry and commerce, protective tariffs, and expansionist foreign policy.

Trump era 
The Oregon Republican Party gained national attention in June 2019 when all 11 Republican state senators staged a "walkout" designed to prevent a vote on Oregon House Bill 2020.  The walkout deepened the alignment of the party with right-wing militias, including Oregon 3 Percenters and Oath Keepers as well as pro-Trump social media.  State Senator Brian Boquist threatened, in response to the state government's efforts to return him to the state capitol in Salem, "send bachelors and come heavily armed." According to the Pew Charitable Trusts, "rare walkouts are ones like that in Oregon, where lawmakers flee the state for several weeks or months. These large events use a lot of political capital and show voters that those lawmakers might be sore losers and unwilling to negotiate."  Oregon Republicans continued such "walkouts" in 2021 to protest coronavirus restrictions and disable normal political processes, as well as organized groups to harass state inspectors doing their lawful work.

Efforts to overturn the 2020 election 
Following the 2021 storming of the United States Capitol, Oregon Republicans again received national attention. On 21 December 2020, an armed group had forcibly entered the Oregon Capitol, caused damage, and sprayed “some kind of chemical agent” at the officers guarding the capitol.  Police identified the chemical agent as "bear spray."  The capitol break-in was promoted by the far-right Patriot Prayer. In January 2021, evidence came to light that Representative Mike Nearman had opened doors to the Oregon Capitol "allowing violent demonstrators who were protesting immediately outside the door to illegally enter the building" and cause damage.  The militia-inflamed "chaos in Oregon over the past year [was] a prologue to the insurrection at the U.S Capitol," in one account.  At least three "men who participated in an effort to storm the Oregon Capitol on December 21st also appear to have been part of the mob that stormed the U.S. Capitol" in January.  Also among the Oregonians arrested for the US Capitol attack was the vice chair of the Young Republicans of Oregon.

"The Trump era seems only to have exacerbated the Oregon GOP’s embrace of its most extreme constituencies," writes the conservative National Review.

On January 19, 2021, the Oregon Republican Party issued a resolution declaring that the 2021 storming of the United States Capitol by supporters of Donald Trump was a "false flag" event meant to "discredit President Trump, his supporters, and all conservative Republicans." Others had previously claimed antifa had staged the attack, though the FBI stated there was no evidence of antifa involvement.

The party resolution provoked substantial controversy. Oregon's House Republicans pointedly disavowed the party resolution, and State Senator Tim Knopp stated publicly that he did "not support the Oregon Republican Party’s resolution." Knute Buehler, a former Oregon House member and recent Republican gubernatorial nominee, "filed to change his registration from Republican to independent." State Senator Brian Boquist also left the party and joined the Independent Party of Oregon.

More than 6,000 Republicans left the party in January 2021. In early February, state voter registration indicate a total of 11,000 registered Republicans in Oregon have left the party since Election Day.

The 2021-2023 leadership term saw significant officer turnover. Dallas Heard, an Oregon State Senator serving as the chairman of the party, resigned in 2022 after severe internal disagreements with party members. Senator Heard was succeeded as Chair first by Josephine County Commissioner Herman Baertschiger, Jr., then restaurateur Justin Hwang. Following resignations, National Committeewoman Chris Barreto was replaced by former ORP Vice Chair Tracy Honl, while Treasurer Dennis Linthicum, State Senator from Klamath Falls, was replaced by Sodaville city manager Alex McHaddad. Dr. Angela Plowhead was elected Vice Chair in September 2022.

Platform

The party's formal platform, adopted in 2015, expresses opposition to abortion and assisted suicide; support for mandatory minimum sentencing for violent offenders, truth-in-sentencing laws, and the death penalty; lower taxes; deregulation and minimal government intervention in the economy; opposition to same-sex marriage; repeal of the Patient Protection and Affordable Care Act; opposition for "amnesty" for undocumented immigrants; an individual right to keep and bear arms; and voter ID laws. The party's platform, amended in 2019, includes opposition to National Popular Vote Interstate Compact, advocacy of the arming of educational staff "to protect themselves and their students from violence" while opposing gun-free zones; asserting that "marriage is between one man and one woman" and that "there are only two sexes, male and female, based on a person’s biological sex at birth"; favoring that "all government business shall be conducted in English"; continuing repeal of Obamacare; asserting that "violent, radical, Islamic Jihadists and other groups have . . . declared war on America"; and "need for personal responsibility and self-reliance in the event of a disaster."

At the beginning of the 2022 legislative short session, the house republican caucus announced that they would use the session to "fix failures from Democratic leadership by restoring education standards, holding state government accountable and enabling our law enforcement to do its job. We will push to remove roadblocks to health care access and preserve Oregon’s natural environment while protecting the way of life of communities relying on these resources. We will give Oregonians the freedom to recover financially from government-mandated shutdowns by fighting the state’s regulatory burdens and mandates."

The caucus intends to terminate the state of emergency related to COVID-19, and amend the Oregon Constitution to limit the declaration of an emergency to 30 days.

Past elections

Presidents
Republican nominees won 25 of Oregon's 32 Presidential popular votes from 1860 to 1984. Since 1988 the Democratic presidential nominee has won 8 straight popular votes.

Governance
The party is run by an elected state Leadership Team.

County parties 
Each of Oregon's 36 counties have semi-autonomous county leadership teams. They are elected by precinct committee members who in turn are elected by all Republicans in a specific precinct.

Party Chairs

Current elected officials

Members of Congress

U.S. Senate 

 None

Both of Oregon's U.S. Senate seats have been held by Democrats since 2008. Gordon H. Smith was the last Republican to represent Oregon in the U.S. Senate. Elected in 1996, Gordon lost his second re-election attempt in 2008 to Jeff Merkley.

The Oregon Republican Party holds one of the state's five U.S. House seats and neither of the two U.S. Senate seats.

U.S. House of Representatives
Out of the six seats Oregon is apportioned in the U.S. House of Representatives, two are held by Republicans:

Statewide offices

 None

Oregon has not had a Republican in statewide office since 2021 after the retirement of Secretary of State Bev Clarno and the election of Democrat Shemia Fagan to replace her.

State Legislators
The Oregon Republican Party holds a minority 25 of 60 seats in the Oregon House of Representatives and a minority 11 of the 30 Oregon Senate seats.

Senate

House of Representatives

Mayors 
Of the state's ten largest cities, two have Republican mayors as of 2023:

 Medford (8): Randy Sparacino
 Springfield (9): Sean VanGordon

Election results

Presidential

Gubernatorial

See also

 Dorchester Conference

Footnotes

Further reading

 Tom McCall with Steve Neal, Tom McCall, Maverick: an Autobiography. Portland, OR; Binford and Mort, 1977.
 Steve Neal, McNary of Oregon: A Political Biography. Portland, OR: Oregon Historical Society Press, 1985.
 Brent Walth, Fire at Eden's Gate: Tom McCall & the Oregon Story. Portland, OR: Oregon Historical Society Press, 1994.
 Republican League Register, a Record of the Republican Party in the State of Oregon. Portland, OR: Register Publishing Co., 1896.

External links
Oregon Republican Party Website
Oregon Federation of College Republicans

1857 establishments in Oregon Territory
Political parties established in 1857
Republican Party (United States) by state
Republican Party